Hoemunsan is a mountain located in North Jeolla Province, South Korea.

See also
Geography of South Korea
List of mountains in Korea
List of mountains by elevation
Mountain portal
South Korea portal

References

Mountains of North Jeolla Province
Mountains of South Korea